Tollison is a surname. Notable people with the surname include:

Robert Tollison (1942–2016), American economist
Gray Tollison (born 1964), American politician